Slovakia has participated in the Eurovision Young Dancers twice since its debut in 1997. The country returned to the contest after a fifteen-year break in 2015.

Participation overview

See also
Slovakia in the Eurovision Song Contest
Slovakia in the Eurovision Young Musicians

External links 
 Eurovision Young Dancers

Countries in the Eurovision Young Dancers